Simon Morrison is a scholar and writer specializing in 20th-century music, particularly Russian, Soviet, and French music, with special interests in dance, cinema, aesthetics, and historically informed performance based on primary sources.

He has conducted archival research in St. Petersburg, Stockholm, Paris, London, New York, Washington D.C., Copenhagen, and (most extensively) in Moscow. He has traveled to Tel Aviv, Beijing, Hong Kong, Montreal, Moscow, Copenhagen, and Bangkok to give invited lectures and graduate seminars, and divides his time between Princeton and Los Angeles.

Morrison is the author of Mirror in the Sky: The Life and Music of Stevie Nicks (California, 2022), Roxy Music's Avalon (Bloomsbury, 2021), Russian Opera and the Symbolist Movement (California, 2002, 2019), Bolshoi Confidential: Secrets of the Russian Ballet from the Tsars to Today (W.W. Norton, 2016), The Love and Wars of Lina Prokofiev (Houghton, 2013), and The People’s Artist: Prokofiev’s Soviet Years (Oxford, 2009) as well as editor of Prokofiev and His World (Princeton, 2008) and, with Klara Moricz, Funeral Games: In Honor of Arthur Vincent Lourié (Oxford, 2014).

He maintains a profile as a public intellectual by continuing to write books and feature articles, giving interviews and lectures in his areas of expertise, as well as assisting in ballet and theatre productions.

Career
Morrison received his B.Mus. from the University of Toronto (1987), a Master's in Musicology from McGill University (1993), and Ph.D. from Princeton University (1997), where he is Professor of Music. His distinctions include the Alfred Einstein Award of the American Musicological Society (1999), an American Council of Learned Societies Fellowship (2001), a Phi Beta Kappa Society Teacher Award (2006), a Guggenheim Fellowship (2011), and the Howard T. Behrman Award for Distinguished Achievement in the Humanities (2022). He is a leading authority on composer Sergey Prokofiev and has received unprecedented access to the composer's papers, housed in Moscow at RGALI.

As a writer
Morrison's most recent book, Mirror in the Sky: The Life and Music of Stevie Nicks will be published in October 2022 by the University of California Press.

Morrison's book Roxy Music's Avalon, about the eighth and final studio album by the English rock band Roxy Music, was published by Bloomsbury press in 2021 as part of its popular music series 33 1/3.

Morrison's book Bolshoi Confidential: Secrets of the Russian Ballet from the Tsars to Today, was published by Liveright (W.W. Norton) in 2016, with additional translations and editions from Random House (Canada), Fourth Estate (UK), and Belfond (France). It was widely reviewed in major news outlets and shortlisted for the Book Prize of Pushkin House, London.

His biography of Lina Prokofiev, the composer's first wife, was published by Houghton Mifflin Harcourt in 2013. Lina and Serge: The Love and Wars of Lina Prokofiev was featured on BBC Radio 4 (as "Book of the Week"), BBC World News (TV), and WYNC. Reviews appeared in The Guardian, The Boston Globe, The New Yorker, The Daily Beast, and The American Spectator.

Morrison is also author of The People's Artist: Prokofiev's Soviet Years (Oxford University Press, 2009) as well as Russian Opera and the Symbolist Movement (University of California Press, 2002). As Scholar-in-Residence for the 2008 Bard Music Festival, he edited the essay collection Sergey Prokofiev and His World (Princeton University Press, 2008). Among his other publications are essays on Ravel's ballet Daphnis et Chloé, Rimsky-Korsakov, Scriabin, Shostakovich's ballet The Bolt, numerous reviews and shorter articles, including pieces for the New York Times, The New York Review of Books, and London Review of Books.

As a director
Morrison is actively engaged in the performing arts, most notably ballet, and has translated his archival findings into new productions.

In 2005, he oversaw the recreation of the Prokofiev ballet Le Pas d'Acier at Princeton University and in 2007 co-produced a world premiere staging of Alexander Pushkin's drama Boris Godunov featuring Prokofiev's incidental music and Vsevolod Meyerhold's directorial concepts. In 2008, Morrison restored the scenario and score of the original (1935) version of Prokofiev's Romeo and Juliet for the Mark Morris Dance Group. The project involved orchestrating act IV (featuring a happy ending) from Prokofiev's annotations and rearranging the order and adjusting the content of acts I-III. This version of the ballet was premiered on July 4, 2008, and began an international tour in September. Morrison also brought to light Prokofiev's score Music for athletes/Fizkul’turnaya muzyka (1939), which Morrison describes as "cheerful, sardonic music composed for a scary political cause: a Stalinist (totalitarian) display of the physical prowess of Soviet youth."

In the spring of 2010, he staged Claude Debussy's final masterpiece, the ballet The Toy-Box (La boîte à joujoux), using a version of the score premiered in 1918 by the Moscow Chamber Theater that features a previously unknown "jazz overture." Also newly staged was the original version of John Alden Carpenter's jazz ballet, Krazy Kat (1921), based on the iconic comic strip.

In February 2012, Morrison oversaw a world-premiere performance of Prokofiev's incidental music for Eugene Onegin, set to a playscript by Sigizmund Krzhizhanovsky. A concert version was performed by the Princeton Symphony Orchestra, and the play staged by Princeton faculty and students. Both performances were part of a conference Morrison co-organized at Princeton, "After the End of Music History," celebrating the career of musicologist Richard Taruskin.

In 2017, Morrison collaborated with the Penguin Cafe Orchestra to present a revival of Within the Quota (1923), a ballet with music by Cole Porter. The production was featured on NPR, the BBC World News America, and in a news story by the AP.

As a public speaker 
Morrison is an acclaimed public speaker equally in demand by academic and general audiences. Among his subjects of expertise are the history of ballet in France, Russia, and the United States; the music of Tchaikovsky, Prokofiev, and Shostakovich; politics and culture in the Soviet Union, France, Russia, and the United States; Russian culture under Putin; cultural exchange between the Soviet Union and the United States; imperial culture under the Russian tsars; and current trends in Russian music and dance.

He is sought after as a pre-concert lecturer, having been lauded at the Lincoln Center, Carnegie Hall, and the Metropolitan Opera in particular. He has spoken extensively on the music of Tchaikovsky, Prokofiev, Shostakovich, Debussy, Musorgsky, Beethoven, Poulenc, and many other beloved composers.

Morrison is a favored guest on radio and television programs worldwide, including broadcasts in Canada, Australia, New Zealand, Scotland, the UK, and United States.

Selected publications
"Still in Search of Satanilla," 19th Century Music, vol. 46, no. 1, pp. 3–38, 2022. ISSN: 0148–2076, electronic ISSN: 1533–8606.
"Canceling Russian Artists Plays into Putin's Hands," The Washington Post, 11 March 2022. https://www.washingtonpost.com/outlook/2022/03/11/russian-artists-canceled-putin-gergiev-netrebko/. 
“What Next? Shostakovich’s Sixth Symphony as Sequel and Prequel,” Twentieth-Century Music 16, no. 2 (June 2019): 1-27.
“Tchaikovsky: Polestar of the music of the future,” Times Literary Supplement, 21 March 2019. https://www.the-tls.co.uk/articles/public/tchaikovsky-polestar-music-future/.
[with Jason Wang and Nicholas Soter] “Whipped Cream – Viennese Ballet and Pop Surrealism Meet Dark Medicine,” Journal of the American Medical Association 321, no. 7 (19 February 2019): 630–31.
"Galina Ustvolskaya Outside, Inside, and Beyond Music History,” Journal of Musicology 36, no. 1 (2019): 96–129.
“The Golden Cockerel, Censored and Uncensored.” In Rimsky-Korsakov and His World, edited by Marina Frolova-Walker (Princeton: Princeton University Press, 2018), 177–95.
“Experience Prokofiev’s Romeo and Juliet – Without Dance,” Playbill, 23 January 2018.
“Prokofiev: Reflections on an Anniversary, and a Plea for a New Critical Edition,” Iskusstvo muzïki. Teoriya i istoriya 16 (2017): 6-20.
 “Art in an Artless Age.” Times Literary Supplement, 22 July 2016, 16–17.
“Landed: Cole Porter’s Ballet.” In A Cole Porter Companion, edited by Don M. Randel, Matthew Shaftel, and Susan Forscher Weiss (Urbana: University of Illinois Press, 2016), 57–69. 
“‘Zolotoy Petushok’: zametki ob opere, kotoraya stala operoy-baletom i zatem baletom.” In Triumf russkoy muzïki. Rimskiy-Korsakov – okno v mir, ed. L. O. Ader (St. Petersburg: SPb GBUK, 2016), 67-76.
"What the Candidates' Rally Music Says About Them," Time, 25 May 2016. https://time.com/4346962/trump-hillary-bernie-playlists/.
"Debussy's Toy Stories," The Journal of Musicology, vol. 30, no. 3, pp. 424–459, 2013. ISSN 0277-9269, electronic ISSN 1533-8347. https://www.academia.edu/4373238/_Debussys_Toy_Stories_.
"Against Bare Bottoms," London Review of Books, vol. 35, no. 6, 2013. https://www.lrb.co.uk/the-paper/v35/n06/simon-morrison/against-bare-bottoms.
"The Bolshoi's Spinning Dance of Power," New York Times Op-Ed, November 26, 2013.
Lina and Serge: The Love and Wars of Lina Prokofiev. New York: Houghton Mifflin Harcourt, 2013.
The People's Artist: Prokofiev's Soviet Years. New York: Oxford University Press, 2009.
[Editor]. Sergey Prokofiev and His World. Princeton: Princeton University Press, 2008.
[With Nelly Kravetz]. "The Cantata for the Twentieth Anniversary of October, or How the Specter of Communism Haunted Prokofiev." Journal of Musicology 23, no. 2 (2006): 227–62.
"Russia’s Lament." In Word, Music, History: A Festschrift for Caryl Emerson, 657–81. Ed. Lazar Fleishman, Gabriella Safran, Michael Wachtel. Stanford Slavic Studies 29-30 (2005).
"Shostakovich as Industrial Saboteur: Observations on The Bolt." In Shostakovich and His World, 117–61. Ed. Laurel Fay. Princeton: Princeton University Press, 2004.
Russian Opera and the Symbolist Movement. Berkeley and Los Angeles: The University of California Press, 2002.
"Skryabin and the Impossible." Journal of the American Musicological Society 51, no. 2 (1998): 283–330; reprint, Journal of the Scriabin Society of America 7, no. 1 (2002–03): 29–66.

Notes

References
Boris Godunov
"Prokofiev’s Take on Pushkin’s Czar, Revealed at Last," New York Times, Section B, April 13, 2007.
"A Lost 'Boris Godunov' is Found and Staged," New York Times, Section B, April 11, 2007.
"'Godunov' Rises from Stalin’s Terror," International Herald Tribune, April 11, 2007.

Pas d'Acier
"Reaching for Original Intentions in a Prokofiev Ballet,” New York Times, Section E, April 7, 2005.

Romeo and Juliet
"Merriment (and Eternal Love) in Both Their Houses," New York Times, May 15, 2009.
"Romeo, Romeo," The New Yorker, July 7, 2008.
"The Dictator’s Cut: Prokofiev’s 'Romeo and Juliet'," The Independent, July 2, 2008.
"Twist of Fate," Vogue, June 30, 2008.
"O Romeo, Romeo, Wilst Thou Smile at This Finale?" New York Times, Arts & Leisure Section, June 29, 2008.
"Harris Theater Helps Fund 'Romeo and Juliet' Ballet," Chicago Tribune, February 14, 2008.
"But Soft! Less Woe for Juliet and Her Romeo," New York Times, Arts & Leisure Section, November 18, 2007.

Eugene Onegin and Taruskin Conference
James R. Oestreich, "Prokofiev Version of 'Eugene Onegin' in a Russian Weekend at Princeton," New York Times, February 12, 2012.
James R. Oestreich, "The World According to One Musicologist," New York Times, February 15, 2012.

Living people
Music historians
Princeton University faculty
1967 births